John Woodward Blocher II (born August 24, 1951) is an American former professional tennis player.

Born in California, Blocher started getting tennis lessons at the age of seven and was a successful junior player. In 1967, competing in the 16's age division, Blocher won an Orange Bowl title and was the national clay court champion.

Blocher played collegiate tennis for Southern Methodist University but was sidelined for much of the time with a serious wrist injury, although he was an All-American in his senior year.

While playing on the professional tour in the 1970s he reached a best singles ranking of 156 and featured in the main draw at Wimbledon.

Since the 1980s he has coached tennis, in North Carolina and San Diego. He has run his own tennis academies and coached numerous player on the professional tour, including Marianne Werdel and Tim Wilkison.

References

External links
 
 

1951 births
Living people
American male tennis players
SMU Mustangs men's tennis players
Tennis people from California
Sportspeople from Pasadena, California
American tennis coaches